Norfork is a city in Baxter County, Arkansas, United States. The population was 550 at the 2010 census.

Geography
Norfork is located at  (36.209506, -92.281702).

The White River flows 44 miles from Bull Shoals Dam to its confluence with the North Fork River's tailwater at Norfork.

List Of Highways 

 Arkansas Highway 5
 Arkansas Highway 177

Demographics

The racial makeup of the city was 96.07% White, 0.21% Black or African American, 1.50% Native American, 0.41% Asian, 0.41% from other races, and 1.45% from two or more races.  1.41% of the population were Hispanic or Latino of any race.

There were 224 households, out of which 17.0% had children under the age of 18 living with them, 58.5% were married couples living together, 8.5% had a female householder with no husband present, and 31.7% were non-families. 29.9% of all households were made up of individuals, and 14.7% had someone living alone who was 65 years of age or older.  The average household size was 2.16 and the average family size was 2.65.

In the city the population was spread out, with 16.5% under the age of 18, 3.1% from 18 to 24, 16.9% from 25 to 44, 36.4% from 45 to 64, and 27.1% who were 65 years of age or older.  The median age was 53 years. For every 100 females, there were 95.2 males.  For every 100 females age 18 and over, there were 91.5 males.

The median income for a household in the city was $30,192, and the median income for a family was $34,375. Males had a median income of $23,750 versus $19,028 for females. The per capita income for the city was $16,671.  About 7.5% of families and 13.0% of the population were below the poverty line, including 18.9% of those under age 18 and 16.5% of those age 65 or over.

Education 
Norfork is the home of the Norfork School District. Norfork High School was nationally recognized as a silver medalist and ranked No. 18 in Arkansas and No. 1,863 in the nation in the Best High Schools Report 2012 developed by U.S. News & World Report.

Notable people
Dan A. Sullivan, member of the Arkansas House of Representatives for Craighead and Greene counties
Dan Fredinburg, Google executive

References

External links
Norfork Tailwater river system near Norfolk, AR
 Map of Norfork (US Census Bureau)
 Map of Baxter County (US Census Bureau)
 Norfork School District
 Baxter County Historical and Genealogical Society

Cities in Baxter County, Arkansas
Cities in Arkansas